Sinsat is a former commune in the Ariège department in southwestern France. On 1 January 2019, it was merged into the new commune Aulos-Sinsat.

Population
Inhabitants of Sinsat are called Sinsatois.

See also
Communes of the Ariège department

References

Former communes of Ariège (department)
Ariège communes articles needing translation from French Wikipedia
Populated places disestablished in 2019